Captain Underpants and the Preposterous Plight of the Purple Potty People is the eighth book in the Captain Underpants series by Dav Pilkey. It was published on August 15, 2006, two years and eleven months after the previous book. This was the last Captain Underpants book to be published for 6 years, until Captain Underpants and the Terrifying Re-Turn of Tippy Tinkletrousers was published in 2012.

Plot summary
George Beard, Harold Hutchins, Sulu, and Crackers have now ended up in an alternate universe in Melvin's time machine, where the whole world is the opposite of their normal world (instead of being perched up in a tree in the Cretaceous Period of the Mesozoic Era). For example, Melvin Sneedly is dimwitted and struggling to comprehend a simple children's book (which contains content considered offensive in the normal universe), the teachers are nice, the school is better, all the previous villains are good, normal citizens, and Mr. Krupp is nice and has a sense of humor (Like Captain Underpants does). George and Harold soon see evil versions of themselves and learn through one of their evil twins' comics that they had turned their Mr. Krupp into an evil supervillain named Captain Blunderpants (who acts like Mr. Krupp). Sulu and Crackers are kidnapped by Evil George and Evil Harold and are hypnotized to be evil, and then ordered to destroy George and Harold. Sulu immediately attacks, but Crackers does the opposite and saves them (due to secretly being female). 

George, Harold, and Crackers are able to escape to their normal dimension and head to the treehouse, unaware that Nice Mr. Krupp, Sulu, Evil George and Evil Harold came with them (due to standing too close to the machine). Evil George and Evil Harold transform Nice Mr. Krupp into Captain Blunderpants by getting water on his head. Meanwhile, George and Harold decide to head back to the other dimension to rescue and de-hypnotize Sulu and take the 3D Hypno-Ring and Extra-Strength Super Power Juice just in case. However, Mr. Beard stops George and Harold from leaving the house and forces them to come inside as it is Grandparent's Day so they can eat dinner with George's Great-Grandmother and Harold's Grandfather at George's house. While George and Harold try to explain to Mr. Beard they need to leave, George and Harold's grandparents unknowingly drink the rest of the Extra-Strength Super Power Juice while reading a comic George and Harold wrote.

Soon, Evil George and Evil Harold find the treehouse, rummage through it and find the "Goosy-Grow 4000", which they use to transform Sulu into a giant monster. Sulu charges at George and Harold, but Crackers flies in and carries George and Harold away while Sulu attacks the city and Evil George, Evil Harold, and Captain Blunderpants rob a bank. When George and Harold try to drink the Extra-Strength Super Power Juice, they discover it is empty, despite there being a third of juice earlier. George explains that there is only one plan left they can resort to now. They go to Mr. Krupp's house (which George and Harold covered in toilet paper at an earlier point) and knock on his door. Right after Mr. Krupp answers, George and Harold quickly snap their fingers and Mr. Krupp turns into Captain Underpants, who then defeats Sulu. Evil George, Evil Harold, and Captain Blunderpants return from robbing the bank, and order Captain Blunderpants to fight Captain underpants, but George snaps his finger and turns Captain Blunderpants back into Nice Mr. Krupp, having learned how to do so from the double's comic.

Captain Underpants ties the alternate counterparts up, but when Harold states that nothing can go wrong, George warns him that it isn't nice to say things like that, and then a rainstorm suddenly hits and turns Nice Mr. Krupp back into Captain Blunderpants and Captain Underpants back into Mr. Krupp. George and Harold try snapping their fingers, but the rain is pouring too hard on them. Mr. Krupp can't figure out how he got outside, so he goes back to his soggy toilet paper-covered home to get back to bed while Captain Blunderpants frees himself and Evil George and Evil Harold.

George and Harold fly away on Crackers while the doubles pursue them. After arriving at the Treehouse, George finds the Shrinky-Pig 2000, which they could use to shrink their counterparts. Unfortunately, it is too late as Captain Blunderpants grabs the two by their Shirts while the Shrinky-Pig 2000 is taken by Evil George and Evil Harold. Before Captain Blunderpants can finish off George and Harold, George and Harold's grandparents arrive and order Captain Blunderpants to put down their grandchildren, but he refuses, causing George and Harold's grandparents to transform into Boxer Boy and Great-Granny Girdle (having been inspired by George and Harold's comic). They then battle and defeat Captain Blunderpants, saving their grandchildren. George then notes that their grandparents had drunk the rest of the Extra-Strength Super Power Juice earlier.

However, Evil George and Evil Harold appear and plan to use the Shrinky-Pig 2000 on George, Harold, and their grandparents, but Harold uses reverse psychology and claims they can go right ahead as they are holding the device backwards. Evil George and Evil Harold believe this and turn the Shrinky-Pig 2000 around before activating it, resulting in themselves being shrunk. After punishing the evil twins by spanking them, George and Harold's grandparents fly off for a romantic dinner, George and Harold de-hypnotize and shrink Sulu back to normal, and then take Evil George, Evil Harold, and Captain Blunderpants back to their own universe into the Purple Potty.

Harold states everything had worked out perfectly, but then two policemen arrive to arrest them because they think they are the evil George and Harold who robbed a bank with Captain Blunderpants and stated that it looks like they are going to jail for the rest of their lives. A bummed Harold remarks that things cannot get any worse despite George's earlier warnings. Suddenly, a robotic pair of pants appears, piloted by Professor Poopypants (who changed his name to Tippy Tinkletrousers at the end of Captain Underpants and the Perilous Plot of Professor Poopypants). When the cops laugh at Tinkletrouser's name, he freezes them with his Freeze Beam 4000 and begins chasing George, Harold, Crackers and Sulu.

Comics

Comic 1: The Preposterous Plight of Captain Blunderpants (by evil Harold and George)
The alternative boys hypnotize nice Mr. Krupp into becoming Captain Blunderpants to steal things for them. One day, he is chased by an angry cop for stealing a pizza and is involved in a truck accident, mixing chemicals with peanut butter that give him superpowers. He flies to the evil twins with their pizza. From that point, Nice Mr. Krupp turns into Captain Blunderpants by getting his head wet and de-hypnotized by the snap of a finger.

Comic 2: Adventures of Boxer Boy and Great Granny Girdle (by the real George and Harold)
One day, a UFO lands on Earth and opens a store that trades improved Robo-Geezers for real grandparents, which everyone but George and Harold does. One day, their grandparents sneak into the factory and find the other grandparents inside a "slaves room", along with superpower hard candies, which they end up eating. Meanwhile, the store owners discuss their plan. Having made the grandparents slaves, they will feed them the hard candy, giving them superpowers, and allowing the owners to take over the world. When they walk into the slave room, George and Harold's grandparents had eaten all the candy, causing them to become Boxer Boy and Great Granny Girdle, who chase the bad guys into the UFO. They then order all the Robo-Geezers to attack, who quickly outnumber Boxer Boy and Great Granny Girdle. While Great Granny Girdle has the Robo-Geezers chase her, Boxer Boy attacks the UFO and makes it look like hard candy, causing the Robo-Geezers to start eating the UFO in a feeding frenzy, until one bites the fuel line, and blows up all the bad guys. The boys' Grandparents fly back and set the kidnapped grandparents free.

Main characters
 George Beard - A 4th-grade student of the rude and cruel Jerome Horwitz Elementary School and Harold's next-door neighbor.
 Harold Hutchins - A 4th-grade student of the rude and cruel Jerome Horwitz Elementary School and George's friend.
 Evil George Beard - An alternate version of George Beard but wears Harold's clothes.
 Evil Harold Hutchins - An alternate version of Harold Hutchins but wears George's clothes.
 Mr. Krupp - The dreadful principal of Jerome Horwitz Elementary School.
 Captain Underpants - The alter ego of Mr. Krupp.
 Nice Mr. Krupp - The nice, caring principal of the alternate Jerome Horwitz Elementary School.
 Captain Blunderpants - The rude and dreadful supervillain counterpart of Nice Mr. Krupp.
 Boxer Boy - Harold's grandfather, who is one of the two Arthritic Avengers. Here, his name is Henry.
 Great Granny Girdle - George's great grandmother, who is one of the two Arthritic Avengers.
 Sulu - George and Harold's pet hamster.
 Crackers - A pterodactyl from prehistoric times also George and Harold's pet.

Supporting characters
 Melvin Sneedly - George and Harold's nemesis, who is dumb in the alternate universe.
 Miss Anthrope - The secretary of Jerome Horwitz Elementary School.
 Mr. Meaner - The gym teacher of Jerome Horwitz Elementary School, who is buff in the alternate universe.
 Mr. Rected - The guidance counsellor of Jerome Horwitz Elementary School.
 Ms. Guided - The staff member of Jerome Horwitz Elementary School.
 Miss Singerbrains - The school librarian of Jerome Horwitz Elementary School.
 Mr. and Mrs. Beard - George's parents.
 Mrs. Hutchins - Harold's mom.
 Harold's Little Sister
 The Police Chief and Officer McWiggly - They arrested George and Harold, mistaking them as their evil counterparts who robbed a bank.

The following characters appear on pages 46-47:

 Tippy Tinkletrousers - The dastardly villain of the Piqua State Penitentiary. He also appears in the alternate universe with the other supervillains as a fireman. He also also appears in the end with his Robo-Trousers, where he freezes the Police Chief and Officer McWiggly and chases George and Harold and Crackers and Sulu.
 Dr. Diaper - A supervillain in the first Captain Underpants book, but as a police officer.
 The Turbo Toilet 2000 - A supervillain in the second and eleventh Captain Underpants books, but as a crossing guard.
 Zorx, Klax and Jennifer - 3 rude aliens in the third Captain Underpants book, but as firemen.
 The Robo-Boogers - 3 disgusting booger monsters (Carl, Trixie and Frankenbooger) in the 7th book, but Carl appears as a postman, and Trixie and Frankenbooger appeared as construction workers.

Reception
Reviews for the book were mostly positive,  with Kidsreads.com praising the entry.

See also
 Captain Underpants

References

External links
 Sketches and the book cover
 Dav pilkey's official website
 When Hamsters Attack!

2006 American novels
Captain Underpants novels
Novels about parallel universes
Scholastic Corporation books